Betina Jæger is a Danish Dressage rider. She competed at the 2018 FEI World Equestrian Games in Tryon, North Carolina and at the 2019 World Championship for Young Horses in Ermelo. She competes international Grand Prix since 2011.

References 

Danish female equestrians
Danish dressage riders
Living people
1974 births